Daniel Pollard (born August 23, 1983), more commonly known by his stage name HXV (Heroes x Villains), is an American music producer. The first release from HXV was a mixtape titled We Off That, which was introduced under Diplo's Mad Decent label. Following this was his debut EP titled Run the Trap. This included the song "Flex", which caught the attention of Diplo, later landing HXV the opportunity to remix Major Lazer's "Jah No Partial". The response to this remix was outstanding, thus securing him a spot in the community.

Career 
Pollard started DJing at the age of 15, and started HXV in 2009. In 2012 HXV released his first mixtape, We Off That, on Mad Decent, which was hosted by both Lil' Jon and Cobra Corps. This release piqued the interest of both hip hop heads and dubstep bangers. HXV went on to remix songs by numerous artists, including The Weeknd, Young Jeezy and Charli XCX.

In February 2012 HXV, alongside Diplo and Mayhem, produced a mixtape for ATL rap group FKI titled Transformers in the Hood.

In January 2014, both Daniel Disaster and Pete H of HXV released their Chapel EP. This was a collaboration with the fashion brand FRESH.i.AM and Red Bull.

On April 14, 2015 they introduced fans to Vultures, a five-track EP featuring artists including Lil Uzi Vert, Rome Fortune, Ricky Remedy and Debroka.

October 2016 brought light to HXV's emotional single "Novocaine" featuring Daniel Disaster's long time and close friend Naz Tokio. "Novocaine" centers around Daniel's sobriety and the challenges that come with it, Naz being representative of the disease that is addiction.

On November 25, 2016, HXV released Volume 1 of his newly announced Black Friday Mix. The mix features various trap artists, including Eptic, Ekali, Mayhem and KRNE.

Discography

EPs 

 Run the Trap (2012)
 Chapel (2013, Red Bull)
 VULTURES (2015, Ultra Music)

Singles 

 "Today" with Stooki Sound and Rome Fortune (2013)
 "Illusions" with Naz Tokio (2014)
 "Twerk" (2014)
 "We Comin" with Mac TurnUp (2014)
 "Living Life" with OG Maco & Ricky Remedy (2015)
 "What You Off" with Lil Uzi Vert (2015)
 "Made It" with Lil Uzi Vert & Rome Fortune (2015)
 "PLAGUES" with Ricky Remedy & Debroka (2015)
 "Vultures" with Ricky Remedy & Debroka (2015)
 "Novocaine" with Naz Tokio (2016)
 "Scared of Love" (2019)

Remixes 

 Major Lazer featuring Flux Pavilion - "Jah No Partial"
 Gucci Mane - "Lemonade"
 Dimitri Vegas & Like Mike featuring Moguai - "Mammoth"
 Rihanna - "Needed Me"
 Diplo featuring Lil' Jon - "U Don't Like Me"
 Carnage & Borgore - "Incredible"
 Flosstradamus featuring Casino - "Mosh Pit"
 Vanic featuring K.Flay - "Can't Sleep"
 Ace Hood & Future - "Bugatti"
 The Weeknd - "The Hills"
 Knife Party - "LRAD"
 Mayhem & Antiserum - "MPR"
 Trinidad James, 2 Chainz, Future, Waka Flocka, Yo Gotti, & Gucci Mane - "Hoodrich Anthem"
 HYDRABADD featuring Abra - "Sanctuary"
 Doe B. featuring T.I. & Juicy J - "Let Me Find Out"
 Mt. Eden - "Airwalker"
 Povi - "4AM"

Mixes 
 "We Off That"
 "HXV Presents Basel Castle 2014 Mix"
 "HXV Diplo and Friends Uncut"
 "HXV Presents Into the Void 001 VAVLT Exclusive TomorrowWorld Mix"
 "HXV Presents - Into The Void 002 - PARTY OF 1"
 "Metronome: HXV"
 "Black Friday Mix Vol 1"

References

1983 births
Living people
American DJs
Record producers from Georgia (U.S. state)
Remixers